Spod may refer to:
 SPOD (band) a band from Sydney, Australia
 A spod,  an avid user of Internet talkers, a type of online chat system. 
 SPOD, Sea Port of Debarkation
 Spinning Pizza of Death, a colloquial name for a cursor on macOS